The Nude Woman is a 1922 Italian silent drama film directed by Roberto Roberti and starring Francesca Bertini and Angelo Ferrari.

The film's sets were designed by Alfredo Manzi.

Cast
 Francesca Bertini 
 Angelo Ferrari 
 Franco Gennaro 
 Iole Gerli 
 Gino Viotti

See also 
 The Naked Truth (1914)
 The Nude Woman (1926)
 The Nude Woman (1932)

References

Bibliography
 Cristina Jandelli. Le dive italiane del cinema muto. L'epos, 2006.

External links

1922 films
1920s Italian-language films
Films directed by Roberto Roberti
Italian silent feature films
Italian films based on plays
Italian black-and-white films
Italian drama films
1922 drama films
Silent drama films
1920s Italian films